Bifidobacterium asteroides is a gram-positive, rod-shaped species of bacteria. Various strains of this species have been isolated from the hindguts of honey bees. Prior to 1969, this species was referred to as strains of Bacillus constellatus.

References

Further reading

External links
Type strain of Bifidobacterium asteroides at BacDive -  the Bacterial Diversity Metadatabase

Bifidobacteriales
Bacteria described in 1969